Bayi Nanchang may refer to several Chinese professional sports teams based in Nanchang and owned by the People's Liberation Army:

Bayi Rockets, men's basketball team
Bayi Kylin, women's basketball team
Bayi Shenzhen, women's volleyball team
Bayi men's volleyball team
Bayi Nanchang men's table tennis team
Bayi Nanchang women's table tennis team

See also
Shanghai Shenxin F.C., a men's football team formerly known as Nanchang Bayi Hengyuan F.C.
Nanchang Bayi Stadium, a multi-use stadium in Nanchang
Nanchang uprising, also known as Bayi uprising, a major uprising by the Chinese Communists in 1927